Biratnagar Kings led by Nepal's national team captain Paras Khadka is a franchise team representing Biratnagar, a city at the eastern plains of Nepal. It plays in Dhangadhi Premier League.

Cricket teams in Nepal